Malaysia Animation Creative Content Centre (Malay: Pusat Kandungan Kreatif Animasi Malaysia) (MAC3) is an agency founded under the Multimedia Super Corridor (MSC) initiative. The agencies was formed to help creative content creators by providing technology and resources, developing talent, and offering funding.

Facilities
MAC3 has provided rendering and AVP ( Audio-Video Post Production facility), located in Cyberjaya since April 2010. These facilities are provided to support high demand on High Definition, high quality dan stereoscopic content creation process.

References

Malaysian animation
MSC Malaysia